Bakhar may refer to:

Places
 Bhakkar, principal city of Bhakkar District, Punjab, Pakistan
 Bhakkar District, in Punjab, Pakistan; known as Bakhar in the local Seraiki language
 Bakhar Bar, a town in Punjab, Pakistan

Other uses
 Bakhar, a form of Marathi-language historical narrative written from medieval India
 Ilan Bakhar (b. 1975), a retired Israeli football player
 Barak Bakhar (b. 1979), an Israeli football player

See also 
 Bakkar, an Egyptian cartoon series